Thalavoor is a village located in the district of Kollam in the Kerala state of India. It is 77 km to the north of the State Capital, Thiruvananthapuram, and 28 km to the east of District Capital, Kollam. Thalavoor village is bordered by Pattazhy village to the north, Pidavoor village to the north-east, Vilakkudy village to the south-east, Melila village to the south and Mylom village to the west. Thalavoor is a part of Pathanapuram Block Panchayat

History

In earlier times, this land was a part of Elayadathu Swarupam, a principality ruled by a branch of the Travancore Royal Family.
Kottarakkara was the capital of Elayadathu Swarupam.

Etymology
Up to 18th century, this land was a part of "Ilayidathu Swaroopam". At that time, most of the leaders (Malayalam: Thalavanmaar) in the Ilayidathu Swaroopam were from this place. They headed various departments of this royal dynasty. Hence this place came to known as "Thalavoor", meaning "Thalavanmaarude Ooru" i.e. "The Place of Leaders".

Geography

Geographical Location
Latitude  : 9°2'40"N

Longitude : 76°49'46"E

Sectors of Land

The land of thalavoor is traditionally divided into six zones.
Pandithitta (North-West Zone of Thalavoor)
Manjakkala (North-East Zone of Thalavoor)
Nadutheri (Central Zone of Thalavoor)
Njarakkadu (South-East Zone of Thalavoor)
Kura (South-West Zone of Thalavoor)
Vadakodu (South-West Zone of Thalavoor)
Aringada (South Zone of Thalavoor)

Governance
Thalavoor, like other parts of India, is governed by different levels of government such as the three tiers of 'Panchayatraj', namely Village, Block and Jilla and, of course, the state and central governments. The revenue and land administration has the village as the basic unit. 

Wards of Thalavoor Gramapanchayath

Places of worship

Hindu Temples
Sri Durga Devi Kshetram, Trikkonnamarcodu, Njarakkadu
Sri Mahadeva Kshetram, Saptarshimangalam, Nadutheri
Sree Krishna Kshetram, Nadutheri
Sri Gurisimankavu Dharmashasta Kshetram, Pandithitta
Thrikkara Sree Krishna Swami Kshetram, Kura
Sree Mahadeva Kshetram, Chunakkara, Millumukku, Kura
Sri Vasudevancode Kshetram, Vadacode
Charoor Bhagavathy Temple, Vadacode
Kaduvancode Bhagavathy Temple, Vadacode
Sree Durga Devi Temple, Aringada
Sree Nagaraja Kshetram, Randalumoodu
Sree Atoorkavu Devi Kshetram, Manjakala
Sree Mahalakshmi Temple manjakkala pulimukku
Sree Dharmasastha temple manjakkala

Malanadakavu
Chundamala malanadakavu, Randalummoodu

Churches

St. George Orthodox Church, Ambalathinnirappu
Shalom IPC Hall, Ambalathinnirappu
Palakkuzhi Marthoma Church Ambalathinnirappu
Mar Semavoon Destooni Orthodox Church, Manjakkala
Trinity Marthoma Church, Manjakkala
St. Mary's Malankara Catholic Church, Manjakkala
St. George Orthodox Church, Kulamudy
St. Jude Orthodox Chapel, Santhi Bhavan, Nadutheri
St. George Orthodox Church, Naduthery (East), Melepura
Bethel AG Church, Nadutheri
Marthoma Church, Nadutheri
St. Stephen's Orthodox Church, Pandithitta
Tabor Marthoma Church, Pandithitta
Divya Rekshaka Latin Catholic Church (Romapally), Pandithitta
Brethren Church, Pandithitta
St. Mary's Malankara Catholic Church, Pandithitta
C.S.I. Church, Randalummoodu
St. Mary's Orthodox Valiya Palli, Randalummoodu
St. John's Orthodox Church, Vadacodu
St. John's Malankara Catholic Church, Vadacodu
St. Mary's Malankara Catholic Church, Alakkuzhy
Sacred heart latin catholic church, Aringada

Educational institutions
Government Lower Primary School, Vadacodu
Government Lower Primary School, Kura, Thalavoor
Government Lower Primary School, Njarakkadu, Thalavoor
Government Lower Primary School, Pandithitta
Government Upper Primary School, Nadutheri, Thalavoor
Devi Vilasom Vocational Higher Secondary School and Devi Vilasom High School, Thalavoor
Indira Gandhi Memorial Vocational Higher Secondary School, Manjakkala, Thalavoor
Government W.L.P.S., Pandithitta
Christhuraj I.T.C., Pandithitta
Holy Cross Public School, Pandithitta
Government Welfare LPS, Aruvithara

Hospitals
Government Ayurveda Hospital, Nadutheri, Thalavoor
Primary Health Centre, Thalavoor
Ayush Primary health centre, NHM, Homoeo, Thalavoor

Nearby Places
Kunnicode-4 km
Pattazhy-6 km
Pathanapuram-8 km
Kottarakkara-8 km
Punalur-12 km

See also
Kerala
Kollam district

External links

Villages in Kollam District
Map of Pathanapuram Taluk
Thalavoor in the thematic atlas of Kollam District - availability of approach roads
Thalavoor Panchayat - General Information
Outline of Thalavoor Grama Panchayat

References
Latitude and Longitude of Thalavoor

Villages in Kollam district